Yoda is a character in the Star Wars media franchise.

Yoda can also refer to:

People
Karim Yoda, French footballer
Alain Bedouma Yoda, politician from Burkina Faso
Céline Yoda, politician from Burkina Faso
, Japanese sprinter
Jun'ichi Yoda, Japanese poet
Mitsumasa Yoda, Japanese footballer
Norimoto Yoda, professional Go player
Tom Yoda, Japanese businessman
Yoshio Yoda, Japanese actor
Yoshikata Yoda, Japanese screenwriter
Yuichi Yoda, Japanese footballer
Yūki Yoda, Japanese idol and actress
DJ Yoda, British turntablist
Greg Somerville, New Zealand rugby union player

Entertainment
"Yoda" (song), by Weird Al Yankovic
Yoda: Dark Rendezvous, a 2004 Star Wars novel
Sergeant Daniel "Yoda" Dean, a character in NYC 22

Other uses
 Yoda conditions, which describe a computer's programming style
 YODA Project, an open data project for clinical research
 Yoda, a monotypic genus of acorn worms in the family Torquaratoridae with the only species Yoda purpurata

See also
Yoddha (comics), a comic book character published by Raj Comics
Yodo River, Japan
Yoder
Yotta-

Japanese-language surnames